Manuel Jesús Avendaño Valenzuela (born April 7, 1982), known as Manuel Valenzuela, is a Chilean former footballer who played as a defender for Rangers de Talca and Curicó Unido.

Notes

References 
 
 

1982 births
Living people
Chilean footballers
Primera B de Chile players
Chilean Primera División players
Rangers de Talca footballers
Curicó Unido footballers
Association football defenders
People from Talca